The canton of Argentat-sur-Dordogne (before March 2020: Argentat) is an administrative division situated in the Corrèze département and in the Nouvelle-Aquitaine region of France. Since the French canton reorganisation which came into effect in March 2015, the communes of the canton of Argentat are:

 Albussac 
 Altillac 
 Argentat-sur-Dordogne
 Auriac 
 Bassignac-le-Bas 
 Bassignac-le-Haut 
 Camps-Saint-Mathurin-Léobazel 
 La Chapelle-Saint-Géraud 
 Darazac 
 Forgès
 Goulles 
 Hautefage 
 Mercœur 
 Monceaux-sur-Dordogne 
 Neuville
 Reygade 
 Rilhac-Xaintrie 
 Saint-Bonnet-Elvert
 Saint-Bonnet-les-Tours-de-Merle 
 Saint-Chamant
 Saint-Cirgues-la-Loutre 
 Saint-Geniez-ô-Merle 
 Saint-Hilaire-Taurieux
 Saint-Julien-aux-Bois 
 Saint-Julien-le-Pèlerin 
 Saint-Martial-Entraygues
 Saint-Privat 
 Saint-Sylvain
 Servières-le-Château 
 Sexcles

Demographics

See also
Cantons of the Corrèze department

References

Cantons of Corrèze